EEF or Eef may refer to:

People
 Eef, pen name of Ethan Nicolle, American comic illustrator and writer
 Eef, nickname of Ifar Eef Barzelay , Israeli-American musician
 Eef, nickname of Evert Dolman (1946–1993), Danish cyclist
 Eef, nickname of Ethan Nestor, American Youtuber

EEF
 EEF (manufacturers' association), a British manufacturers' organisation
 Early European Farmers
 Eastern Economic Forum, an international forum held each year in Vladivostok, Russia
 Education Endowment Foundation, a British educational charity
 Egypt Exploration Fund, a British archaeological organization
 Egyptian Expeditionary Force, a British Empire force in World War I
 enterprise environmental factor, a factor that originates from outside of the project or organization
 Eukaryotic elongation factors
 European Ecological Federation

See also
 Eefing, a vocal technique

Lists of people by nickname